The 2006 season of the ASFA Soccer League (now known as the FFAS Senior League) was the twenty sixth season of association football competition in American Samoa. Tafuna Jets won the championship, their first title in twenty-one years existence. Winning qualified the Jets to the 2007 OFC Champions League however the team did not choose to compete.

League setup
Nine teams, all from American Samoa competed in two groups with the top two from each group advancing to a knockout round for the championship.

Group stage

Pool 1

Pool 2

Semi-finals

Final

References

FFAS Senior League seasons
Amer
football